Tatiana Golovin was the defending champion, but withdrew from the tournament with injury.

Maria Sharapova won the title, defeating Dominika Cibulková in the final 7–6(9–7), 6–3. This was Sharapova's 19th career title, but her first title on clay, after 7 years on the WTA tour.

Seeds

The top 8 seeds receive a bye into the second round.

Draw

Key
 Q = Qualifier
 WC = Wild card
 LL = Lucky loser
 w/o = Walkover
 r = Retired

Finals

Top half

Section 1

Section 2

Bottom half

Section 3

Section 4

References

External links
 Official Results (WTA)
 ITF tournament edition details

3008 Singles
2008 WTA Tour